Stasio or di Stasio is a surname. Notable people with the surname include:

Frank Stasio, American talk radio host
Justina di Stasio (born 1992), Canadian wrestler
Marilyn Stasio, American author, writer, and literary critic
Ralph di Stasio (born 1981), stage name Avery Storm, singer